The Hyundai i20 Coupe WRC (originally known as the Hyundai New Generation i20 WRC) is a World Rally Car built by Hyundai for use in the World Rally Championship starting in 2017. It is based on the Hyundai i20 subcompact car, and is the successor to the Hyundai i20 WRC used between 2014 and 2015.

Three i20 Coupe WRCs were entered for the 2017 season, where they were driven by Thierry Neuville, Hayden Paddon and Dani Sordo. Later into the season they also signed Andreas Mikkelsen. Neuville scored four wins and eight podiums, finishing runner-up behind Ogier, who switched to M-Sport.

All four drivers continued in 2018 season. Neuville won three races and claimed six podiums, but was again outscored by Ogier.

World Rally Championship results

Championship titles

WRC victories

Complete World Rally Championship results

See also
 World Rally Car
 Citroën DS3 WRC
 Citroën C3 WRC
 Ford Fiesta WRC
 Ford Fiesta RS WRC
 Hyundai i20 WRC
 Mini John Cooper Works WRC
 Toyota Yaris WRC
 Volkswagen Polo R WRC

References

External links

Technical details at wrc.com 
Hyundai i20 Coupé WRC at ewrc-results.com

World Rally Cars
i20 Coupe WRC
All-wheel-drive vehicles
World Rally championship-winning cars